Motels is the first studio album by new wave band The Motels, recorded in the spring of 1979 and released in the fall.  It was produced by John Carter.  It peaked at #175 on Billboard's album chart in December.

On May 12, 1979 (Mother's Day), The Motels signed with Capitol Records. The band began recording on the May 14 and finished within the first week of September. The band consisted of Martha Davis (lead vocals, guitar), Jeff Jourard (lead guitar), Marty Jourard (keyboard, saxophone), Michael Goodroe (bass) and Brian Glascock (drums).

The first single, "Closets and Bullets", did not chart anywhere, but the second single, "Total Control", became a Top 10 hit in Australia and went Top 20 in France.  (It 'Bubbled Under' at #109 in Billboard in the US.) A third single, "Anticipating", was released in Japan in early 1980 but failed to chart. The album was certified Gold in Australia in 1980.

Tina Turner recorded "Total Control" in 1985 on the We Are the World album, a superstar charity recording for famine relief efforts in Ethiopia. Anna Oxa recorded the song in Italian and it was released as a single in Italy in 1980.

Track listing

Charts

Weekly charts

Year-end charts

Certifications and sales

Personnel
Credits are taken from the CD's liner notes.

The Motels
Martha Davis – vocals, rhythm guitar
Jeff Jourard – lead guitar
Marty Jourard – keyboards, saxophone
Michael Goodroe – bass
Brian Glascock – drums

Production
Credits are taken from the CD's liner notes.
Produced and engineered by John Carter

Notes

References

1979 debut albums
The Motels albums
Capitol Records albums